This is a list of recording artists who have reached number one on Billboard magazine's weekly singles chart(s). This list spans from the issue dated January 1, 1955 to the present.  Prior to the creation of the Billboard Hot 100, Billboard published four weekly singles charts: "Best Sellers in Stores", "Most Played by Jockeys", "Most Played in Jukeboxes" and "The Top 100" (an early version of the Hot 100).  The Hot 100 began with the issue dated August 4, 1958, and is currently the standard music popularity chart in the United States.

List inclusions
All acts are listed alphabetically, solo artists by last name, groups by group name excluding "A", "An", and "The".
Each act's total of number-one hits is shown after their name.
All artists who are officially namechecked in song credits are listed here; this includes one-time pairings of otherwise solo artists and those appearing as "featuring". Exceptions to this rule:
 Paul McCartney's hits with Wings are credited to "Wings" even though many of them were released as "Paul McCartney & Wings". McCartney's total is only from hits not attributed to Wings nor the Beatles. If entries from The Beatles, Wings and McCartney were combined, his total of number one hits would be 29, making him the most successful artist in the history of the chart.
 Diana Ross, as some number-one hits credited to "Diana Ross and the Supremes", are attributed to The Supremes only. If Ross's solo entries here were combined with those of The Supremes, it would bring her total of number one hits to 18, making her the female artist with the second most total number one hits, after only Mariah Carey with 19.
 "That's What Friends Are For" charted as "Dionne & Friends".  Each vocalist on the recording (Dionne Warwick, Elton John, Gladys Knight and Stevie Wonder) are given individual credit for a number-one song.
 Both Wham! and George Michael get one credit for "Careless Whisper".  Technically the song is a solo recording and was released as such in many parts of the world except the U.S., where it charted as "Wham! featuring George Michael".
 "We Are the World" is credited to "USA for Africa", and not the individual artists who participated in the recording.
Double A-sides are counted as one number-one single.
Artists associated with a group who reached number one, yet have their own solo page in Wikipedia, are not listed here unless they hit number one as a solo artist.
Artists who hit number one prior to the start of the Hot 100 are included here.
A song that topped multiple pre-Hot 100 charts is counted only once towards the artist's total.
The ° symbol indicates that all or part of an artist's total includes number-ones occurring on any of the pre-Hot 100 chart(s) listed above (January 1, 1955 through July 28, 1958).

0-9
112 (1)
21 Savage (2)
24kGoldn (1)
50 Cent (4)
6ix9ine (1)
98 Degrees (1)

A

B

C

D

E

F

G

H

I
Billy Idol (1)
Enrique Iglesias (2)
James Ingram (2)
INXS (1)

J

K

L

M

N

O

P

Q
Quavo (1)
Queen (2)
Question Mark & the Mysterians (1)

R

S

T

U–V

W

X–Z

See also
List of number-one hits (United States)
List of best-selling music artists
List of artists who reached number one on the UK Singles Chart
List of Billboard Hot 100 number-ones by British artists

References

External links
Fred Bronson's Billboard Book of Number 1 Hits, 5th Edition
Joel Whitburn's Top Pop Singles 1955-2008, 12 Edition
Joel Whitburn Presents the Billboard Pop Charts, 1955-1959
Joel Whitburn Presents the Billboard Hot 100 Charts: The Sixties
Joel Whitburn Presents the Billboard Hot 100 Charts: The Seventies
Joel Whitburn Presents the Billboard Hot 100 Charts: The Eighties
Joel Whitburn Presents the Billboard Hot 100 Charts: The Nineties
Additional information obtained can be verified within Billboard's online archive services and print editions of the magazine.